Rashida Jones (born ) is the president of the cable news network MSNBC, succeeding Phil Griffin on February 1, 2021. Jones is the first Black woman to lead a cable news network.

Early life and education 
Jones was born to Richard and Alice Adkins, the oldest of three children. She grew up in York, Pennsylvania. The family later moved to Richmond, Virginia, where she attended Henrico High School and became editor of the student newspaper.

Jones attended Hampton University, majoring in broadcast journalism. She graduated from Hampton in 2002 with a degree in Mass Media Arts. In 2022, Jones established a scholarship fund at Hampton University for journalism students.

Career
In 2002, while a senior in college, she worked as a morning show producer at WTKR in Norfolk, Virginia. After several years there, she moved to The Weather Channel as a weekend producer, and became director of live programming in 2009.

Jones later worked at WIS-TV in Columbia, South Carolina, as news director, then moved to New York City as an executive producer for daytime shows at MSNBC. Later roles included managing editor at MSNBC and  senior vice president of specials for NBC News and MSNBC, in which she managed dayside and weekend news programming on MSNBC, as well as leading coverage of breaking news and major events across NBC News and MSNBC. Jones expanded the town-hall concept to a wider audience, including a criminal justice special filmed at Sing Sing correctional facility. While a senior vice president at NBC News and MSNBC, she led a shift from election coverage to a focus on COVID-19.

In 2021, Jones became the first African-American woman to run a major cable news network.

Honors and awards
 Jones is a member of the Scripps Howard School of Journalism and Communications Hall of Fame.
 In 2020, she was named in Variety's 2020 New York Women's Impact Report
In October, 2022, Jones was the inaugural recipient of the Media Leadership Award from Montclair State University School of Communication and Media.
In February, 2023, Jones was awarded the Achievement of Excellence Award from Scripps Howard School of Journalism & Communications at Hampton University and headlined the institution's 20th anniversary celebration.
 Jones received the Radio Television Digital News Foundation's Leonard Zeidenberg First Amendment Award on March 2, 2023.

Personal life 
Jones is divorced and has two children, a son and daughter. Her partner is Edward Fisher, the community and government relations executive at American University.

References

Living people
American television executives
MSNBC people
Women television executives
African-American television producers
American women television producers
American television producers
Hampton University alumni
Henrico High School alumni
Year of birth missing (living people)